The 2019 Kentucky Wildcats baseball team represented the University of Kentucky in the 2019 NCAA Division I baseball season. For the first season, the Wildcats played their home games at their new stadium, Kentucky Proud Park.

Preseason

Preseason All-American teams

1st Team
Zack Thompson - Starting Pitcher (Baseball America)

SEC media poll
The SEC media poll was released on February 7, 2019 with the Wildcats predicted to finish in sixth place in the Eastern Division.

Preseason All-SEC teams

1st Team
T.J. Collett - Designated Hitter/Utility
Zack Thompson - Starting Pitcher

Roster

Personnel

Coaching staff

Schedule and results

† Indicates the game does not count toward the 2019 Southeastern Conference standings.
*Rankings are based on the team's current ranking in the D1Baseball poll.

Record vs. conference opponents

Rankings

References

Kentucky
Kentucky Wildcats baseball seasons
Kentucky Wildcats baseball